The RK 20 is an American trailerable sailboat that was designed by Lyle C. Hess as a cruiser and first built in 1972.

The RK 20 is a development of the Hess-designed Balboa 20, as is the Ensenada 20.

Production
The design was built by RK Industries, a subsidiary of Coastal Recreation, in the United States. It was built between 1972 and 1981, but it is now out of production.

Design
The RK 20 is a recreational keelboat, built predominantly of fiberglass, with wood trim. It has a masthead sloop rig; a spooned, raked stem; an angled transom; a transom-hung rudder controlled by a tiller and a swing keel or fixed fin keel. The swing keel version displaces  and carries  of ballast, while the fin keel version displaces  and carries  of ballast.

Two cabin designs were available, a trunk cabin and a raised deck version.

The boat is normally fitted with a small  outboard motor for docking and maneuvering.

The design has sleeping accommodation for four people, with a double "V"-berth in the bow cabin and two straight settee berths in the main cabin.

Operational history
In a 2010 review Steve Henkel noted, "the RK20 fixed-keel version would seem preferable, since it eliminates the mechanical problems some owners have experienced with the swing keel."

See also
List of sailing boat types

Related development
Balboa 20
Ensenada 20

References

External links
Photo of an RK 20

Keelboats
1970s sailboat type designs
Sailing yachts
Trailer sailers
Sailboat types built in the United States
Sailboat type designs by Lyle Hess
Sailboat types built by Coastal Recreation, Inc